Kandor Graphics is a Spanish 3D computer animation feature and short film studio  in Granada, Spain, established in 1992. The studio produced feature films The Missing Lynx and Justin and the Knights of Valour, and short films The Tell-Tale Heart and The Lady and the Reaper.

Feature films

Short films 
 The Tell-Tale Heart (Animated Short, 2005).
 The Lady and the Reaper (Animated Short, 2009). Nominated in the 82nd Academy Awards for Best Animated Short

References

External links
 

Spanish animation studios
Mass media companies established in 1992
Spanish companies established in 1992